Cabeza Vainilla is one of three sculptures by Javier Marín. The statues are commonly installed in museums and squares. The whole set features giant heads. As of 2021, Cabeza Vainilla is installed in Zapopan's Plaza de las Américas Juan Pablo II, in the Mexican state of Jalisco.

References

External links
 
 

Outdoor sculptures in Jalisco
Sculptures of men in Mexico
Zapopan